Camp Pendleton South is a census-designated place (CDP) in San Diego County, California, located at the southwest corner of the Marine Corps Base Camp Pendleton. The population was 10,616 at the 2010 census, up from 8,854 at the 2000 census. Much of the population are residents of Camp Pendleton barracks situated in the area, as well as housing communities for married Marine and Navy personnel and their families. It, along with  Camp Pendleton Mainside CDP, is one of two CDPs on the base.

Geography
Camp Pendleton South is located at  (33.216620, -117.390989).

Demographics

2010
At the 2010 census Camp Pendleton South had a population of 10,616. The racial makeup of Camp Pendleton South was 7,530 (70.9%) White, 992 (9.3%) African American, 146 (1.4%) Native American, 299 (2.8%) Asian, 41 (0.4%) Pacific Islander, 725 (6.8%) from other races, and 883 (8.3%) from two or more races. Hispanic or Latino of any race were 2,586 persons (24.4%).

The census reported that 9,338 people (88.0% of the population) lived in households, 1,278 (12.0%) lived in non-institutionalized group quarters, and no one was institutionalized.

There were 2,569 households, 2,101 (81.8%) had children under the age of 18 living in them, 2,284 (88.9%) were opposite-sex married couples living together, 173 (6.7%) had a female householder with no husband present, 43 (1.7%) had a male householder with no wife present.  There were 7 (0.3%) unmarried opposite-sex partnerships, and 8 (0.3%) same-sex married couples or partnerships. 65 households (2.5%) were one person and 0 (0%) had someone living alone who was 65 or older. The average household size was 3.63.  There were 2,500 families (97.3% of households); the average family size was 3.69.

The age distribution was 4,261 people (40.1%) under the age of 18, 2,675 people (25.2%) aged 18 to 24, 3,513 people (33.1%) aged 25 to 44, 161 people (1.5%) aged 45 to 64, and 6 people (0.1%) who were 65 or older.  The median age was 21.7 years. For every 100 females, there were 119.6 males.  For every 100 females age 18 and over, there were 135.5 males.

There were 2,865 housing units at an average density of 715.7 per square mile, of the occupied units 11 (0.4%) were owner-occupied and 2,558 (99.6%) were rented. The homeowner vacancy rate was 0%; the rental vacancy rate was 10.3%.  36 people (0.3% of the population) lived in owner-occupied housing units and 9,302 people (87.6%) lived in rental housing units.

2000
At the 2000 census there were 8,854 people, 2,004 households, and 1,947 families in the CDP. The population density was 2,308.3 inhabitants per square mile (890.2/km). The racial makeup of the CDP was 62.37% White, 14.30% African American, 1.60% Native American, 3.81% Asian, 0.70% Pacific Islander, 10.76% from other races, and 6.46% from two or more races. Hispanic or Latino of any race were 19.10%.

Of the 2,004 households 80.5% had children under the age of 18 living with them, 90.1% were married couples living together, 4.8% had a female householder with no husband present, and 2.8% were non-families. 2.4% of households were one person and none had someone living alone who was 65 years of age or older.  The average household size was 3.53 and the average family size was 3.56.

The age distribution was 34.8% under the age of 18, 30.0% from 18 to 24, 34.0% from 25 to 44, 1.2% from 45 to 64, and 0.1% who were 65 years of age or older.  The median age was 22 years. For every 100 females there were 150.5 males.  For every 100 females age 18 and over, there were 180.8 males.

The median household income was $32,829 and the median family income  was $31,998. Males had a median income of $21,311 versus $24,010 for females. The per capita income for the CDP was $11,114.  About 7.9% of families and 8.4% of the population were below the poverty line, including 10.3% of those under age 18 and none of those age 65 or over.

Government

See also
 Camp Pendleton Mainside CDP

References

External links

Census-designated places in San Diego County, California
North County (San Diego County)
Census-designated places in California